Dar Pahn or Dar-e Pahn may refer to:
 Dar Pahn, Hormozgan
 Dar Pahn, Kerman
 Dar Pahn Rural District, in Hormozgan Province